USS Coronado (AGF-11) (originally LPD-11) was the second ship of the United States Navy to be named after the city of the same name in the U.S. state of California. The ship was launched on 1 July 1966, commissioned on 23 May 1970, and became the most advanced command ship in the world. The ship was the second combatant ship in the United States Navy to integrate women as full-time crew members.

Coronado was decommissioned on 30 September 2006, was used for target practice during Valiant Shield 2012 exercises, and was sunk in the Marianas Island Range Complex on 12 September 2012.

History
The Coronados keel was laid down on 1 May 1965 by the Lockheed Shipbuilding and Construction Company of Seattle, Washington. She was launched on 1 July 1966. After two years of labor shortages and a 12-month strike, she was commissioned 23 May 1970.

First assigned to the U.S. Atlantic Fleet in the 1970s, Coronado conducted extensive operations, deploying on numerous occasions to the Caribbean Sea and Mediterranean Sea, as well as northern Europe.

In 1980, the Coronado was re-designated an Auxiliary Command Ship (AGF-11).

Reassigned in October 1985, the Coronado relieved  as the command ship of Commander, U.S. Sixth Fleet. During a ten-month tour with the Sixth Fleet, Coronado operated out of Gaeta, Italy, participating in operations in the Gulf of Sidra and strikes against Libyan terrorist support facilities.

In July 1986, the Coronado was relieved as Sixth Fleet command ship and ordered to Pearl Harbor, Hawaii, to become the command ship for Commander, U.S. 3rd Fleet. The admiral and his staff embarked on board Coronado in November 1986. Subsequently, Coronado was relieved as Third Fleet command ship and deployed to the Persian Gulf to assume duties as command ship for Commander, U.S. Middle East Force in January 1988. During this period she served as flagship for Operation Praying Mantis, the largest American naval action since World War II.

Upon her return to Pearl Harbor on 9 November 1988, Coronado again assumed her duties as Commander, U.S. Third Fleet command ship. USS Coronado remained homeported in Hawaii until August 1991, when crew and staff changed homeports to San Diego.

On 28 February 1994, Coronado became the first combatant ship in the United States Navy to embark women as part of its regular, full-time crew. Since then, Third Fleet and Coronado had become the center for naval innovation and technology experimentation. In November 1998 a large ship modification was completed. Incorporating the latest network-centric technology, Coronado became the most advanced command ship in the world.

Sea-Based Battle Lab
In October 2001, the Office of the Secretary of the Navy assigned Coronado to host the Navy's Sea-Based Battle Lab (SBBL), an afloat platform for testing prototype systems and software, evaluating future naval capabilities, and assessing operational compatibility and possible further implementation throughout the United States Navy.

Developments in technology spawned significant advances in naval warfare capabilities. Wireless and web-based tools, along with new weapon systems, enabled naval forces to conduct precision operations with greater synchronization, expedience, and potency.

The Third Fleet J9 Directorate was responsible for managing the SBBL. Partnered with other services, national laboratories, academia, and industry, the Third Fleet staff developed joint exercises and experiments for evaluating the following in an operational environment:
 JTF Command Center organization and configuration
 Tactics, techniques, and procedures
 Naval and joint doctrine
 Biometrics (human feature recognition)
 Wireless applications
 Knowledge management
 Web-based applications
 Logistics
 Humanitarian assistance/disaster relief

Decommissioning and disposal 
Late 2003 saw a see-saw change for the Coronado. In November the ship was decommissioned, transferred to the Military Sealift Command and redesignated T-AGF-11. However, it was concluded shortly thereafter that the operations the ship engaged in required it to be a warship and thus the vessel was transferred back to the Navy and recommissioned, but kept a large civilian complement within the crew from the MSC. In 2004, the 7th Fleet command ship, went into dry dock and Coronado temporarily assumed 7th Fleet command responsibilities. On 27 September 2004, Blue Ridge returned to duty as the command ship.

Coronado was decommissioned at the end of Fiscal Year 2006.

On 12 September 2012, the Coronado was sunk by a number of warships, and now serves as an artificial reef for the Marianas region.

References

External links

1966 ships
Austin-class amphibious transport docks
Cold War amphibious warfare vessels of the United States
Ships built by Lockheed Shipbuilding and Construction Company